Season twelve of Dancing with the Stars premiered on March 21, 2011, on the ABC network.

Pittsburgh Steelers wide receiver Hines Ward and Kym Johnson were the winners of the competition, while actress Kirstie Alley and Maksim Chmerkovskiy finished second, and Disney star Chelsea Kane and Mark Ballas finished third.

Cast

Couples
A link on the official website gave viewers the chance to recommend celebrities whom they wanted to see on season 12 of the show. 

The cast was revealed on February 28, 2011, during The Bachelor, and the professional partners were revealed on March 2. Hip-hop artist Romeo, who had been slated to appear on season 2 before he had to withdraw due to an injury, was one of the contestants to compete this season. This was also the first season to feature a dance troupe, which consisted of six dancers: Oksana Dmytrenko, Tristan MacManus, Peta Murgatroyd, Kiki Nyemchek, Nicole Volynets, and Ted Volynets.

Future appearances
Kirstie Alley returned for the All-Stars season, where she was again paired with Maksim Chmerkovskiy.

Host and judges
Carrie Ann Inaba, Bruno Tonioli, and Len Goodman returned to the show as judges, while Tom Bergeron and Brooke Burke returned as co-hosts.

Scoring charts

Notes

 : This was the lowest score of the week.
 : This was the highest score of the week.
 :  This couple finished in first place.
 :  This couple finished in second place.
 :  This couple finished in third place.
 :  This couple was eliminated.

Highest and lowest scoring performances 
The highest and lowest performances in each dance according to the judges' 30-point scale are as follows.

Couples' highest and lowest scoring dances
Scores are based upon a potential 30-point maximum.

Weekly scores
Individual judges' scores in the charts below (given in parentheses) are listed in this order from left to right:  Carrie Ann Inaba, Len Goodman, Bruno Tonioli.

Week 1: First Dances
The couples danced either the cha-cha-cha or foxtrot. Couples are listed in the order they performed.

Week 2: First Elimination
The couples danced either the jive or quickstep. Couples are listed in the order they performed.

Week 3: Personal Story Week
The couples performed one unlearned dance. The rumba, samba, waltz, and paso doble were introduced. Couples are listed in the order they performed.

Week 4: Classical Week
The couples performed one unlearned dance. The Viennese waltz was introduced. Couples are listed in the order they performed.

Week 5: American Week 
The couples performed one unlearned dance. Couples are listed in the order they performed.

Week 6: Guilty Pleasure Week
The couples performed one unlearned dance. Couples are listed in the order they performed.

Week 7: Ballroom Greats Week
Individual judges scores in the chart below (given in parentheses) are listed in this order from left to right: Donnie Burns, Carrie Ann Inaba, Len Goodman, Bruno Tonioli.

The six couples were divided into two teams to perform a cha-cha-cha team dance, and each couple also performed one unlearned dance. Couples are listed in the order they performed.

Week 8: Instant Choreography Week 
Each couple performed two dances. The salsa and Argentine tango were introduced. Couples are listed in the order they performed.

Week 9: Semifinals
Each couple performed two unlearned dances, plus competed in a "winner takes all" cha-cha-cha dance competition. Two couples faced off against each other, with the winners from each match competing against each other for fifteen bonus points. Couples are listed in the order they performed.

Week 10: Finals
Night 1

Night 2

Dance chart 
The celebrities and professional partners danced one of these routines for each corresponding week:
 Week 1 (First Dances): One unlearned dance (cha-cha-cha or foxtrot)
 Week 2 (First Elimination): One unlearned dance (jive or quickstep)
 Week 3 (Personal Story Week): One unlearned dance
 Week 4 (Classical Week): One unlearned dance 
 Week 5 (American Week): One unlearned dance 
 Week 6 (Guilty Pleasure Week): One unlearned dance 
 Week 7 (Ballroom Greats Week): One unlearned dance & team dances 
 Week 8 (Instant Choreography Week): One unlearned dance & instant dance 
 Week 9 (Semifinals): Two unlearned dances & cha-cha-cha dance-off 
 Week 10 (Finals, Night 1): Judge's choice dance & freestyle
 Week 10 (Finals, Night 2): Favorite dance of the season

Notes

 :  This was the highest scoring dance of the week.
 :  This was the lowest scoring dance of the week.
 :  This couple gained bonus points for winning this dance-off.
 :  This couple gained no bonus points for losing this dance-off.
 :  This couple danced, but received no scores.

Ratings
Season 12 was one of the most watched seasons. Numerous episodes were the most watched show in the USA for the week. The show tied with Modern Family, a sitcom which also airs on ABC, for the season's No. 5 spot in the age 18–49 demographic of viewers, and placed at No. 3 on the rankings of the overall season.

References

External links 

Dancing with the Stars (American TV series)
2011 American television seasons